Kim Jin-woo (Hangul: 김진우; Hanja: 金珍友) (born March 7, 1983 in Gwangju, South Korea) is a right-handed starting pitcher who played for the Kia Tigers from 2002 to 2007, then from 2011 to 2017. He also participated in the 2002 Asian Games for South Korea.

Filmography

Television show

References 

 KBO Profile and stats

Asian Games medalists in baseball
Baseball players at the 2002 Asian Games
Kia Tigers players
KBO League pitchers
South Korean baseball players
Sultanes de Monterrey players
1983 births
Living people
Asian Games gold medalists for South Korea
Medalists at the 2002 Asian Games
South Korean Buddhists
Sportspeople from Gwangju